The Virus is the fourth studio album by American rapper Brotha Lynch Hung, released through Black Market Records on November 13, 2001. The Virus is the follow-up to EBK4. Like EBK4, this album was also rumored to have been released without the consent of Lynch due to ongoing disputes with Black Market. It was Lynch's final studio album released through Black Market Records, although there would be several subsequent compilations released on the label.

Track listing

Charts

Brotha Lynch Hung albums
2001 albums